Matsudaira Yoritaka may refer to:

Matsudaira Yoritaka (Shishido)
Matsudaira Yoritaka (Takamatsu)